The Bachelor was a British reality television show that began airing on BBC Three from 30 March 2003 to 13 February 2005, before moving to Channel 5 from 19 August 2011 to 31 August 2012. The show is based on the American reality series of the same name. On 31 August 2018, it was announced that the show would return for a new 10-part series in 2019 on Channel 5. The short-lived 'revival' ran from 4 March 2019 to 14 March 2019.

Plot
The series revolves around a single bachelor (deemed eligible) and a pool of romantic interests (typically 25), which could include a potential wife for the bachelor. The conflicts in the series, both internal and external, stem from the elimination-style format of the show. Early in the season, the bachelor goes on large group dates with the women, with the majority of women eliminated during rose ceremonies. As the series progresses, women are also eliminated on one-on-one dates and on elimination two-on-one dates. The process culminates with home-town visits to the families of the final four women, overnight dates at exotic locations with the final three women, and interaction with the bachelor's family and the final two women.

Series overview

Series 1 (2003)
The first series aired on BBC Three from 30 March to 4 May 2003.

Series 2 (2004)
The second series aired on BBC Three from 23 January to 27 February 2004.

Series 3 (2005)
The third series aired on BBC Three from 9 January to 13 February 2005.

Series 4 (2011)

The fourth series aired on Channel 5 from 19 August to 28 October 2011.

Series 5 (2012)

The fifth series aired on Channel 5 from 29 June to 31 August 2012.

Series 6 (2019)

On 31 August 2018, it was announced that a new series would be filmed this autumn in South Africa for Channel 5. The new series was hosted by Mark Wright.

Transmissions

Cancellation
In June 2020, Channel 5 has announced that The Bachelor UK would not return, after just one series since 2019.

References

External links
.
.

2003 British television series debuts
2019 British television series endings
2000s British reality television series
2010s British reality television series
2000s British game shows
2010s British game shows
BBC Television shows
British television series based on American television series
British television series revived after cancellation
Channel 5 (British TV channel) reality television shows
British TV series
Television series by Warner Bros. Television Studios